Stephen or Steven Nash may refer to:

Sports
Stephen Nash (rugby league) (born 1986), English rugby league footballer
Stephen Nash (swimmer) (born 1956), British butterfly swimmer
Stephen Nash (volleyball) (born 1985), Canadian volleyball player
Steve Nash (born 1974), Canadian basketball coach and former player
Steve Nash (rugby league) (born 1949), English rugby league footballer

Others
Stephen Nash (diplomat) (born 1942), former British Ambassador to Albania, Georgia and Latvia
Stephen D. Nash (born 1954), English wildlife artist
Stephen P. Nash (1821–1898), American lawyer
Steven G. Nash (1938-1991), American politician